H. gracilis may refer to:

 Haopterus gracilis, an extinct pterosaur species from the Barremian-Aptian-age Lower Cretaceous Yixian Formation of Liaoning, China
 Harttia gracilis, a catfish species
 Hemaris gracilis, the hummingbird moth or slender clearwing
 Hemidactylus gracilis, the graceful leaf-toed gecko, a gecko species found in India
 Herpomyces gracilis, a fungus in genus Herpomyces
 Heterophasia gracilis, the grey sibia, a bird species found in China, India and Myanmar
 Hetschkia gracilis, a spider species found in Brazil
 Homalia gracilis, James in Peck, a moss species in the genus Homalia
 Horsfieldia gracilis, a plant species found in Brunei and Malaysia
 Hydrangea gracilis, a flowering plant species native to China
 Hymenocephalus gracilis, the graceful grenadier, a rattail species

Synonyms
 Hesperilla gracilis, a synonym for Anisynta cynone, a butterfly species found in New South Wales, Victoria and South Australia
 Hylodes gracilis, a synonym for Batrachyla leptopus, a frog species found in Argentina and Chile

See also
 Gracilis (disambiguation)